Pond Gap is an unincorporated community in Kanawha County, West Virginia, United States. Pond Gap has a post office with ZIP code 25160.

The community was so named on account of there being a pond and mountain pass near the original town site.

References

Unincorporated communities in Kanawha County, West Virginia
Unincorporated communities in West Virginia